10th ZAI Awards
Artmedia Music Academy Awards
Presenter(s)  

Broadcaster STV

Grand Prix Václav Patejdl

◄ 9th │ 11th ►

The 10th ZAI Awards, honoring the best in the Slovak music industry for individual achievements for the year of 1999, took time and place on February 25, 2000 at the Park kultúry a oddychu in Bratislava. The ceremony was held in association with the local Music Fund (HF) and the International Federation of the Phonographic Industry Slovakia (SNS IFPPI). As with the previous edition, the accolades were named after the Artmedia Music Academy, established by ZAI and the related company in 1999.

Winners

Main categories

Other nominees included also Street Dancers, Peter Lipa, Adriena Bartošová and No Name.

Others

References

External links
 ZAI Awards > Winners (Official site)
 Artmedia Awards > 1999 Winners (at SME)

10
Zai Awards
1999 music awards